Tito Livio De Sanctis (10 July 18178 February 1883) was an Italian physician.

Biography

Early life
Tito Livio De Sanctis was born at San Martino sulla Marrucina, in a family of modest conditions, by Francesco Saverio and Colomba De Sanctis. He carried out his first studies in the college of Chieti showing the propensity for studying and maturing over time an excellent humanistic culture

Doctor of medicine
His first experiences in the medical studies (Anatomy, Physiology, Surgery) were at l'Aquila.
He graduated in Naples at University 'Federico II'.

MD career
He was appointed surgeon at the Ospedale dei Pellegrini and at Complesso degli Incurabili, important hospitals of Naples. In 1861, he became professor of surgical pathology at University 'Federico II'.

He wrote many scientific works, among his most significant publications there were: Corso generale di Patologia Chirurgica, a book adopted for years by the Neapolitan surgical school, Ulceri e piaghe: saggio di clinica chirurgica, Chirurgia italiana e la Patologia Cellulare.

References

19th-century Italian physicians
1817 births
1883 deaths